The Union Jack dress is an item of clothing worn by singer Geri Halliwell of the Spice Girls at the 1997 Brit Awards. The mini dress featured a flag of the United Kingdom, the Union Jack, on the front, and a white CND symbol emblazoned on the black-coloured back of the dress. The next day the images of the dress made the front page of various newspapers around the world, and is now remembered as one of the most iconic pop moments of the 1990s and Brit Awards history. The dress has become synonymous with the Spice Girls, Halliwell and the notions of Girl Power, and Cool Britannia.

According to The Daily Telegraph, the dress came top in a 2010 online poll to find the 10 most iconic dresses of the past 50 years, beating other memorable garments such as Marilyn Monroe's white 'Seven Year Itch' halterneck. In 2016, the dress was voted the "Most Inspiring British Fashion Moment" in an online poll conducted by British online retailer Very.

At the 2010 Brit Awards, the Spice Girls performance that featured the Union Jack dress won Most Memorable Performance of 30 Years. The dress held the Guinness World Record for the most expensive piece of popstar clothing sold at an auction.

Background and history

The Spice Girls were scheduled to open the 1997 Brit Awards, where they were also nominated for five awards. The black Gucci minidress that Halliwell was given to perform in concerned her as she thought it was too "boring". Halliwell decided she wanted to "celebrate being British" and asked her sister, Natalie, to stitch a Union Jack tea towel onto the front of the black dress as a patriotic gesture. To avoid being associated with the National Front, Halliwell also had the CND peace symbol stitched onto the back of the dress. Halliwell wore the finished dress whilst performing a medley of "Wannabe" and  "Who Do You Think You Are" at the Brit Awards on 24 February 1997. The group also won two awards that evening.

Sale
In 1998, a year after Halliwell performed in the dress, she auctioned it off at the London branch of Sotheby's for £41,320. The buyer was Peter Morton, on behalf of the Hard Rock Hotel and Casino, Las Vegas, who displayed the piece of clothing as pop memorabilia. Morton bid via telephone, and beat other bidders such as The Sun. Halliwell herself watched the "frenzied bid", and rapped the gavel after the final bid. The dress was originally valued at £12,000, but the winning bid was £36,200 (£41,320 including 15% commission). Halliwell gave the proceeds of the dress sale to a children's cancer care charity. The BBC commented on the sale, saying it "marks the end of Geri's links with the Girl Power image of the past". It held the Guinness World Record for the most expensive piece of popstar clothing dealt at auction. The dress was one of many items of Spice Girls memorabilia sold at the auction, where total sales reached £146,511 for charity.
The auction, with Halliwell auctioning off the Union Jack dress as the final lot, can be seen in the documentary Geri by Molly Dineen.

2007 remake
For the 2007 Spice Girls reunion tour, named the Return of the Spice Girls, fashion designer Roberto Cavalli designed Halliwell a new Union Jack dress modelled on the original. The new version appeared slightly longer and the flag was made out of rhinestones and Swarovski crystals. It was reported by various media outlets that Halliwell had attempted to buy back the original dress prior to the commencement of their world tour.

Halliwell stated in a later interview that she "liked" the new dress and that she had decided to keep it as memorabilia.

2012 clothing range
In 2012 Halliwell designed a clothing range based upon the dress.

2019 version
For the Spice World – 2019 Tour, Halliwell wore a redesigned floor length Union Jack dress that featured royal designs on the red stripes and also wore a crown with the dress.

Gallery

See also
 List of individual dresses

References

1990s fashion
British fashion
Individual dresses
1997 clothing
Dress
Geri Halliwell
Multicolor dresses
Red carpet fashion